Washington, D.C. is the capital of the United States and home to over 600,000 residents. Its diversity has fostered a culture that is unique to the country. Washington, D.C. has a wide range of restaurants, theaters, historic sites, and events.

Arts

Washington, D.C. is a national center for performing art organizations and institutions.

Dance
Washington, D.C. is one of the top cities in the United States for pre-professional dance students to train. Schools, such as the Kirov Academy of Ballet of D.C. and Washington School of Ballet, receive hundreds of students from around the country for their summer and year-round programs.

Washington Ballet, formerly known as the Washington School of Ballet, was founded in 1944 by dance pioneer Mary Day. Washington Ballet remains as one of the foremost training schools in the United States that attracts students from across the country and abroad to train in the nation's capital. Mary Day, founder and former director of the Washington Ballet from 1976 to 1999, possessed a unique vision for American ballet and is credited with having trained countless influential dancers, including Kevin McKenzie, Virginia Johnson, Amanda McKerrow, Marianna Tcherkassky, and Patrick Corbin.

The Suzanne Farrell Ballet is a ballet company at the Kennedy Center that began as a series of classes for local dance students. Founded in 2006 by Suzanne Farrell, an American ballerina student of George Balanchine, the troupe has evolved to be a prestigious ballet company attracting students from around the world. The company has performed iconic works of George Balanchine, Jerome Robbins, and Maurice Béjart. Farrell announced in September 2016 that the company will disband indefinitely in December 2017, citing her desire to return to teaching full-time.

Washington, D.C. hosts several contemporary and modern dance companies that tour frequently in the area, including Urban Bush Women and the Alvin Ailey American Dance Theater, as well as Broadway musicals, plays, and revivals.

Music

Go-go is a musical subgenre that is a blend of funk, blues, and rhythm, and old-school hip-hop that originated in the Washington, D.C. area in the early 1970s by Chuck Brown. The term "go-go" was originally used to describe places where young people partied. During concerts, the percussion section of a band would continually play music while the band leader engaged the audience through a call and respond method during concerts. This call and respond method later changed the term "go-go" to represent the music subgenre. Many bands contributed to the evolution of go-go music including Rare Essence, Trouble Funk, Junkyard Band, and Experience Unlimited. 

Founded in 1798, the United States Marine Band is the country's oldest professional musical organization whose unique mission is "to provide music for the President of the United States and the Commandant of the Marine Corps." On New Year's Day in 1801, the band officially debuted at the White House for President John Adams and has since performed for State Dinners, South Lawn Arrivals, presidential inaugurations, and receptions. The Marine Band performs on average 200 times a year.

The Navy band was often an ensemble of a fife and drummer until the group expanded and became the United States Navy Band, the oldest band in the U.S. Navy. In May 1794, Captain Robert Dale ordered a crew that consisted of 21 privates, one sergeant, one corporal, and two musicians. In 1836, John H. Page became the first bandmaster in the Navy.  The United States Navy Band's headquarters is at the Washington Navy Yard. They perform at official events and public concerts around the city.

The U Street Corridor is a commercial and residential district in Northwest Washington, D.C. that holds many restaurants, clubs, shops, and art galleries. Formerly known as "Washington's Black Broadway", U Street was once the center of African-American culture in the United States. U Street is the home to the Bohemian Caverns and the Lincoln Theatre, and is the birthplace of jazz musician Duke Ellington.

Washington, D.C. is an important center for indie culture and music. Ian MacKaye founded the label Dischord Records, which is one of the most important independent labels created for 1980s punk and eventually indie rock in the 1990s.[35] TeenBeat Records and Simple Machines are other indie labels created in Washington, D.C.

Theater 

Founded in 1950, Arena Stage is one of the first nonprofit theaters in the U.S. that has achieved national attention and spurred growth in the city's independent theater movement that included organizations such as the Shakespeare Theatre Company, Woolly Mammoth Theatre Company, and the Studio Theatre. Arena Stage has produced 22 productions that have been performed on Broadway, including Sweat, Dear Evan Hansen, and The Velocity of Autumn. Arena Stage opened its newly renovated home at Southwest Waterfront in 2010.

The GALA Hispanic Theatre is a national center for the Latino performing arts that has showcased over 200 productions that range from classical Spanish theater to the works of local, young Latinos. Founded in 1976 by Hugo Medrano, GALA shares the Latino art and culture to the public by creating productions that touch communities today, and preserves the Hispanic heritage for future generations. The GALA Hispanic Theater is housed in the historic Tivoli Theatre in Columbia Heights.

The historic Ford's Theatre was one of the top entertainment venues in Washington, D.C. during the Civil War. President Abraham Lincoln visited the theater at least ten times before being assassinated. After Lincoln's assassination in the theater, Ford's Theater remained closed for over 100 years before becoming a national historic site in 1968 that continues to operate as a functioning performance space today.

John F. Kennedy Center for the Performing Arts
The John F. Kennedy Center for the Performing Arts is the busiest performing arts facility in the nation, hosting approximately 2,000 performances annually. The center opened in 1971 and functions as a multi-dimensional facility as it is both a "living memorial" to President John F. Kennedy and a performing arts center. It is home to the National Symphony Orchestra, the Suzanne Farrell Ballet, and the Washington National Opera. In addition, it hosts performances by the Washington Ballet, the Royal Ballet, and Alvin Ailey American Dance Theater, as well as various art festivals, touring Broadway productions, Galas, and special events.

The Kennedy Center Honors are awarded the first weekend of December every year to individuals in the performing arts who have contributed greatly to the cultural life of the United States. The Honors Gala is one of the annual cultural highlights of the Washington, D.C. art scene and is attended by various respected individuals in film, theater, dance, and music as well as the President of the United States and the First Lady.

The Mark Twain Prize for American Humor is presented annually by the John F. Kennedy Center for Performing Arts to an individual who has made an impact on American society much like Mark Twain. Past recipients include Tina Fey, Ellen DeGeneres, George Carlin, and Eddie Murphy.

Food

Washington, D.C. features a range of establishments that include a variety of international cuisines as well as many beloved neighborhood restaurants.

In 2016, it was announced that Washington, D.C. would be one of four cities in the United States to receive its own Michelin Guide.

Architecture

Events
For two weeks every summer during the Fourth of July holiday, the Smithsonian Folklife Festival is held in Washington, D.C. The festival is an international show of the living cultural heritage in the area where visitors sing, dance, try craft or game workshops, and educate themselves about different cultures.

Historic Sites and Museums

Washington, D.C. has hundreds of historical sites that tourist and local citizens visit, including 30 museums, 20 theaters, 20 libraries, and numerous art galleries and monuments.

Museums
Washington, D.C. has many private art museums that house major collections and exhibits open to the public. Among the museums are the National Museum of Women in the Arts, which is the only museum in the world dedicated to showcasing women's creative works; and The Phillips Collection in Dupont Circle, which is the first museum of modern art in the United States. Other private museums in Washington include the O Street Museum Foundation, the International Spy Museum, and the National Geographic Society Museum, as well as the United States Holocaust Memorial Museum near the National Mall, which maintains exhibits, documentation, and artifacts related to the Holocaust.

Smithsonian Institution 

The Smithsonian Institution is an educational foundation that was created with the funds from British scientist James Smithson in 1846. The institution is composed of 19 museums and one zoo in Washington, D.C. The Smithsonian's locations had a combined total of 30 million visits in 2013. The most visited museum is the National Museum of Natural History on the National Mall. Other Smithsonian Institution museums and galleries on the mall are the National Air and Space Museum, the National Museum of African Art, the National Museum of American History, the National Museum of the American Indian, the Sackler and Freer galleries, the Hirshhorn Museum and Sculpture Garden, the Arts and Industries Building, the S. Dillon Ripley Center, and the Smithsonian Institution Building (also known as "The Castle"), which serves as the institution's headquarters. The Smithsonian American Art Museum and the National Portrait Gallery are housed in the Old Patent Office Building near Washington's Chinatown. The Renwick Gallery, which is located in a separate building near the White House, is officially part of the Smithsonian American Art Museum. Other Smithsonian museums and galleries include the Anacostia Community Museum in Southeast Washington, the National Postal Museum near Union Station, and the National Zoo in Woodley Park.

National Mall and Memorial Parks 
The National Mall and Memorial Parks (NAMA) includes over 1,000 acres of parkland in the nation's capital. NAMA is responsible for the Washington Monument, Thomas Jefferson Memorial, Lincoln Memorial, Franklin Delano Roosevelt Memorial, District of Columbia War Memorial, National World War II Memorial, Korean War Veterans Memorial, Vietnam Veterans Memorial, George Mason Memorial, Pennsylvania Avenue, the National Mall and various other historic sites.

The National Mall is a large, open park in downtown Washington between the Lincoln Memorial and the United States Capitol. Given its prominence, the mall is often the location of political protests, concerts, festivals, and presidential inaugurations.

Tidal Basin 
The Tidal Basin is a man-made reservoir created between 1882 and 1897 to prevent the Potomac River from flooding. The Tidal Basin is surrounded by cherry blossom trees that were once gifts from Mayor Yuki Ozaki of Tokyo in 1912. The basin is a popular tourist spot, especially in April during the National Cherry Blossom Festival when the cherry blossoms are in peak bloom. Historic sites, including the Franklin Delano Roosevelt Memorial, George Mason Memorial, Jefferson Memorial, Martin Luther King, Jr. Memorial, and the District of Columbia War Memorial, also surround the Tidal Basin.

National Gallery of Art 
The National Gallery of Art is on the National Mall near the Capitol and features American and European art. Andrew W. Mellon donated his art collection to Congress and offered to use his own funds in hopes of creating a national art museum. With the support of President Franklin D. Roosevelt, Congress accepted his offer and began constructing the National Gallery of Art in March 1937. The gallery and its collections are owned by the U.S. government but are not a part of the Smithsonian Institution. The museum primarily features European and American art from the Renaissance until today. Loan exhibitions are an important aspect to the gallery. Previous loan exhibitions include Art of Aztec Mexico, Alexander Colder, and The Age of Sultan Suleyman the Magnificent.

National Archives and Records Administration 
The National Archives and Records Administration (NARA) houses thousands of documents that are important to American history, including the Declaration of Independence, the United States Constitution, and the Bill of Rights. Although they have holdings that date back to 1775, President Franklin Roosevelt officially established the National Archives in 1934. NARA archives two to five percent of Federal records that contain importance in any given year. NARA's archives range from historical documents, such as the Constitution, to public records of ordinary citizens, such as naturalization records of immigrants.

Libraries
The District of Columbia Public Library includes 25 public neighborhood libraries around the district and one central library. In 1896, the library was created by an act of Congress to provide residents of the District printed materials and information.

The Library of Congress is the largest library complex in the world with a collection of over 147 million books, manuscripts, recordings, newspapers, and other materials.[30] The U.S. Congress uses the Library as its main research arm. The U.S. Copyright Office is also located in the Library.

Sports

Washington, D.C. is home to four major professional men's sports team and one major professional women's team. The Verizon Center in Washington's Chinatown is home to the Washington Wizards of the National Basketball Association (NBA), the Washington Capitals of the National Hockey League (NHL), and the Washington Mystics of the Women's National Basketball Association (WNBA). Nationals Park, which opened in Southeast Washington in 2008, is home to the Washington Nationals of Major League Baseball (MLB). RFK Stadium, which was named after U.S. Senator and presidential candidate Robert F. Kennedy, is the home of D.C. United of Major League Soccer (MLS). FedEx Field in Landover, Maryland is the home of the Washington Redskins of the National Football League (NFL). Other professional and semi-professional teams in Washington include the Washington Kastles of the World Team Tennis, the Washington, D.C. Slayers of American National Rugby League, the Baltimore Washington Eagles of the U.S. Australian Football League, the D.C. Divas of the Independent Women's Football League, and the Potomac Athletic Club RFC of the Rugby Super League.

The Washington Redskins, renamed the Washington Commanders, have won three Super Bowls.[37] D.C. United has won four MLS Cup titles; the Washington Wizards have won one NBA championship.[39] Together, current Washington, D.C. teams have a combined nine professional sports championships.

Washington, D.C. has other sports venues that host various sporting events throughout the year. The William H.G. FitzGerald Tennis Center in Rock Creek Park hosts the Citi Open, a tournament dedicated to providing educational and athletic programs to athletes in the inner city school system. The Marine Corps Marathon, which is held every autumn, and the Rock 'n' Roll USA Marathon, which is held in the spring, are both hosted in Washington, D.C. The Marine Corps Marathon, which is sometimes called the "People's Marathon" because it is the largest marathon that does not offer prize money to participants, began in 1976.

Washington, D.C. is home to six NCAA Division I teams. The Georgetown Hoyas men's basketball team is the most notable team in the area after winning seven Big East tournament championships and ten Big East regular season championships. They won the NCAA Final Four in 1984 after appearing in it five times. Their home games are also played at the Verizon Center.

From 2008 to 2012, Washington, D.C. hosted the annual Military Bowl, a post-season NCAA college football bowl game, at the RFK Stadium.

Media

Newspapers
Washington, D.C. has two daily newspapers. The Washington Post is an American newspaper that is distributed in Washington, D.C. and the greater Washington, D.C. metropolitan area. Founded in 1877, it is the oldest newspaper extant. The newspaper exposed the Watergate scandal, leading to the resignation of U.S. president Richard Nixon. In 2008, the newspaper won six separate Pulitzer Prizes; in total, it has won 47 Pulitzers since its founding. The Washington Post also has a daily free newspaper called the Express, which summarizes events, sports, and entertainment. The Washington Times, a daily newspaper that covers U.S. and local politics and news.

Other print media include Washington City Paper, a newspaper that serves the Washington, D.C. area. On February 1, 2005, the free daily tabloid Washington Examiner, which began as a chain of suburban newspapers known as the Journal Newspapers, debuted. The weekly Washington Blade and Metro Weekly both focus on lesbian, gay, bisexual, and transgender issues in Washington, D.C. The Washington Informer is a female-owned daily newspaper that focuses on African American issues. Street Sense is a bi-weekly newspaper that focuses on issues of homelessness and poverty.

Many neighborhoods in Washington, D.C. have their own community newspapers that are usually published on a weekly basis, including The Current Newspapers, which has editions serving Dupont Circle, Foggy Bottom, Georgetown, Chevy Chase, and Upper Northwest, and a Capitol Hill paper, The Voice of the Hill. Specialty newspapers, such as the Roll Call and The Hill, predominantly cover the White House, U.S. Congress, and American politics.

Television
Washington, D.C. is the ninth-largest television market in the U.S. The metro area is served by several local broadcast television stations including major television network affiliates, such as WRC 4 (NBC), WTTG 5 (Fox), WJLA 7 (ABC), WUSA 9 (CBS), WDCA 20 (myNetwork TV), WDCW 50 (The CW), WETA 26, and WHUT 32 (PBS). The Public Access Corporation of the District of Columbia (DCTV) provides local programming for Washington, D.C. News Channel 8 is a regional news station on all cable systems in Washington, D.C. and surrounding communities. Additionally, many Baltimore television stations are viewable in the Washington region, especially in the suburbs of the Interstate 95 corridor between both cities. Baltimore news stations include WMAR 2 (ABC), WBAL 11(NBC), WJZ 13 (CBS), WMJF 16 (MTV2), WMPT 22 (PBS), WMPB 67 (MPB), WUTB 24 (MyNetwork TV), WBFF 45 (FOX), and WNUV 54 (The CW).

Telemundo's WZDC-LP 25 and Telefutura's WMDO-CA are Spanish-language, low-power television networks that are limited to the Capital Beltway area. Univision's WFDC, however, transmits as a full power station that can be received as far north as Baltimore. Incidentally, Washington, D.C's Univision and Telefutura stations, which are owned by Entravision, switched call letters on January 1, 2006. This meant that Univision would now be the only Spanish station that can be seen at full power over the whole Washington metropolitan area. Univision moved from low-powered Channel WMDO to full-powered WFDC; Univision's youth-oriented Telefutura network moved from WFDC to WMDO.

Azteca, a Spanish-language television network, announced on October 6, 2006, that they would start transmitting from WQAW-LP, a new full-powered Spanish-language broadcast affiliate in the region, as well as its addition to local channel lineups for Comcast Cable.

Several cable television networks have their headquarters in the Washington area including C-SPAN on Capitol Hill, Black Entertainment Television (BET) in Northeast Washington, Discovery Communications in Silver Spring, Maryland, and the Public Broadcasting Service (PBS) in Alexandria, Virginia. Major national broadcasters and cable outlets, including NBC, ABC, CBS, FOX, and CNN, maintain a significant presence in Washington. BBC, CBC, and Al Jazeera, television networks from around the world, also maintain a presence in the area.

Television Shows and Movies

Many television series and movies have featured Washington, D.C. Many television shows, such as The West Wing, Commander in Chief, The District, and Get Smart, have been related to government or security organizations. Other programs have had the nation's capital as a secondary focus as they told stories that were not tied to the infrastructure of Washington, D.C. For instance, Murphy Brown focused on the lives of reporters of a fictional Washington-based television news-magazine, FYI. The soap opera Capitol allowed for stories about political intrigue alongside the traditional class struggle sagas. The sitcom 227 portrayed the life of African Americans through the eyes of residents in a Washington apartment building. Cory in the House on The Disney Channel uses Washington, D.C. as a backdrop.

Many movies are shot and filmed in the city yearly. Movies, such as Wedding Crashers, All the President's Men, Being There, Hollow Man and National Treasure, have main characters who are often linked to politics or adventures.

Radio

Several major radio stations with a wide range of musical interests serve Washington, D.C. Hot 99.5 is a contemporary music station located in Rockville, Maryland. DC 101 is the city's alternative rock station. Urban stations include WPGC 95.5 FM, WHUR 96.3 FM,  Majic 102.3, WKYS 93.9 FM, and Radio CPR. WGTS 91.9 FM of Takoma Park and WPIR 89.9 of Warrenton, Virginia are two major contemporary Christian music stations in the region. Talk and sports stations include The Fan, WSBN 630 AM, The Answer, WOLDSCNews, ESPN 980, WAVA 105.1 FM, WTOP, and Federal News Radio.

WOLDNews, 93.9 WKYS, and Majic 102.3 are owned by an urban-oriented, African-American media conglomerate, Washington's Radio One. It was founded by Cathy Hughes, a prominent figure in Washington radio since her days at Howard University's WHUR.

The American University Radio and Classical WETA are two affiliates of the National Public Radio (NPR). Other prominent stations in the area include 97.1 WASH, WMZQ-FM, BIG 100, WLZL, El Zol 107.9, Praise 104.1, WPFW 89.3 FM, WMAL-FM, and mix 107.3.  Many major radio stations from Baltimore can be heard in the Washington metropolitan area.

XM Satellite Radio and NPR are based in Washington. The U.S. government's international broadcasting service, Voice of America, is headquartered in Washington.

Latino community

The Latino community represents 9% of Washington, D.C.'s population. In 2010, the largest Latino population in Washington, D.C. were Salvadorans, followed by Mexicans and Puerto Ricans respectively. Communities from Peru, Guatemala, Honduras, Colombia, and other Latin American countries are also represented in Washington, D.C.

Services
Spanish is the second most-spoken language in the country. Many government programs and facilities provide services in Spanish for the Latino community. Centers, such as the Whiteman-Walker Clinic and the Department of Human Services, offer services in Spanish and have special programs for the Latino community. The Metro and other transportation systems offer information in both English and Spanish. The Office of Latino Affairs was created in 1976 to serve the Latino community in the area. Ayuda is a national immigration legal directory that helps Latinos and other immigrants with legal issues. The Hispanic Access Foundation is a non-profit organization in Washington, D.C. that works to improve the lives of Latinos in the United States by promoting civic engagement and helping them gain trustworthy support systems.

Health 
Several medical centers, such as La Clinica del Pueblo, Mary's Center, and M Health Fairview, cater to the needs of the Latino population by providing services in Spanish. Many hospitals offer bilingual services including translators and bilingual staff on call twenty-four hours a day.

Entertainment 
Cultural programs and events for the Latino community happen all across the city, including frequent concerts by top Latin music artists such as Juanes, Shakira, Alejandro Fernández, Juan Gabriel, and Ricky Martin.

The GALA Hispanic Theatre shares the Latino arts and cultures to the public by creating productions that touch communities today, and preserves the Hispanic heritage for future generations.

Univision, Telemundo, and Azteca América are some of the Latino television networks in the area. El Zol and Radio Viva are some of the Latino radio stations in the area.

Education 
Washington, D.C. has several bilingual schools, including Oyster Elementary school, Bell Multicultural High School, and Carlos Rosario International Public Charter School. Its major colleges and universities include Ana G. Méndez University System, George Washington University, Howard University, Gallaudet University, and the University of Maryland, College Park. Several colleges and universities in the area have Spanish and Latino representatives for the recruitment of Latino students. Several organizations, such as the Latin American Youth Center, help foster the educational and professional needs of young Latino students.

Blogs 
Washington has several blogs related to culture, history, and the arts. Some examples include The DC Darlings, Federal Baseball, Ghosts of DC, Streets of Washington, PoPville, and DCist.

Newspapers 
El Tiempo Latino, Washington Hispanic, Las Americas newspaper, and El Pregonero are Latino newspapers found in Washington, D.C.

Neighborhoods
Latinos can be found all across the city but high rent and gentrification programs have pushed many of them out; however, some areas, such Adams Morgan, Bloomingdale, Columbia Heights, Georgia Avenue and Petworth, and Shaw, have high populations of Latinos.

See also 
 Washington, D.C.

References 

 
Art in Washington, D.C.